Bishop's ring may refer to:
 An episcopal ring, worn by a bishop or archbishop
 Bishop's Ring, a diffuse brown or bluish halo observed around the sun in the presence of large amounts of dust in the stratosphere